Houssine Benali (born 15 August 1969) is a retired Moroccan footballer who played as a midfielder.

Benali began his professional career with Douai, and went on to play for Nice, but only played ten Ligue 2 matches for the club. He moved to Belgium and played for Eendracht Aalst and Roeselare. Benali joined Ethnikos Asteras for the 1999–00 and 2000–01 Greek Alpha Ethniki seasons. He had a brief stint with Panionios during the 2001–02 Alpha Ethniki season, followed by a stint with Fostiras F.C. during the 2002–03 Beta Ethniki season.

References

1969 births
Living people
Association football midfielders
Moroccan footballers
Moroccan expatriate footballers
OGC Nice players
S.C. Eendracht Aalst players
K.S.V. Roeselare players
Ethnikos Asteras F.C. players
Panionios F.C. players
Moghreb Tétouan players
Ligue 2 players
Super League Greece players
Expatriate footballers in France
Expatriate footballers in Belgium
Expatriate footballers in Greece
SC Douai players